Oscar Norich Stadium is a sports venue in Tsumeb, Namibia. It is the home stadium of Chief Santos.

References

Tsumeb
Sports venues in Namibia
Football venues in Namibia
Buildings and structures in Oshikoto Region